The World Cyber Games Challenge was held in Yongin, South Korea from the October 7th to the 15th in 2000. Total prize money was $200,000.

Official games 

First-person shooter (FPS)
 Quake III Arena

Real-Time Strategy (RTS)
 Age of Empires II
 StarCraft: Brood War

Sport
 FIFA 2000

Results

References 

2000 in esports
2000 in South Korean sport
World Cyber Games events
Esports in South Korea